George L. Hannah (11 December 1928 –  5 May 1990) was an English footballer who played as a forward.

Biography
Hannah was born in Liverpool, England and signed for Newcastle United from Linfield in 1949 staying until 1957. He won an FA Cup winners medal in 1955, scoring the third goal in a 3–1 victory over Manchester City. He spent a season at Lincoln City before he moved to Manchester City in 1958 where he stayed until 1964, making 114 appearances and scoring 15 goals, before transferring to Notts County. His final season was with Bradford City before he retired in 1966. In his career, he played in 374 Football League games, scoring 63 goals, over the course of 17 seasons.

After retirement from the game, Hannah, his wife June and their two children, Julie and Dale, moved back to Manchester. He bought a newsagent shop in Fallowfield in 1966 and ran it for 10 years until 1977, when he sold the shop and took a job working for British Telecom until his retirement in 1990. After a short illness, Hannah died in May of the same year.

References

1928 births
1990 deaths
English footballers
English Football League players
Newcastle United F.C. players
Lincoln City F.C. players
Manchester City F.C. players
Notts County F.C. players
Bradford City A.F.C. players
Footballers from Liverpool
Association football forwards
British Telecom people
FA Cup Final players